Emily Elizabeth Spurrell (born 1 November 1987) is a British Labour Party politician who was elected as the Merseyside Police and Crime Commissioner (PCC) in May 2021. She was previously a Liverpool City councillor for Mossley Hill and the deputy Police and Crime Commissioner for Merseyside.

Liverpool City Council
At the 2012 Liverpool City Council election Spurrell contested the Mossley Hill ward in south Liverpool, comfortably taking the seat from the Liberal Democrats with 51.97% of the vote. She was re-elected to represent the Mossley Hill ward in 2016 and continued to do so until the delayed May 2021 elections which she did not recontest.

In 2014 she was appointed as a Mayoral Lead for Community Safety before being appointed as the Cabinet Member for Community and Safer Neighbourhoods until 2017. During this time, she oversaw the development of a Domestic Abuse Strategy, instigated a new approach to community cohesion and chaired the CitySafe Board which provided funding to local groups to improve community safety. She also helped Liverpool to secure Purple Flag status, recognising the city’s safe and vibrant night time economy. From 2019 she was a member of the Merseyside Fire and Rescue Authority.

Police and Crime Commissioner
In 2017 she was appointed as the Deputy Police and Crime Commissioner for Merseyside by Jane Kennedy. As Deputy PCC, she championed victims and led on work to tackle violence against women and girls. She developed a scheme to engage employers in tackling domestic abuse, re-launched the modern slavery and trafficking network, initiated a project to investigate experiences of sexual violence across Merseyside, successfully lobbied for all police staff to be paid the living wage and developed an action plan to better support women offenders.

Spurrell resigned as Deputy PCC in March 2019 following Kennedy's resignation from the Labour Party. She was then appointed as an advisor on tackling violence against women and girls to the Metro Mayor of the Liverpool City Region.

In May 2019 Spurrell launched her campaign to be the Labour Party candidate for Merseyside in the 2020 Police and Crime Commissioner elections. Jane Kennedy, who was continuing to sit as an Independent, had announced that she would not be seeking re-election. Spurrell was opposed in the Labour Party selection by former Bedfordshire Police and Crime Commissioner, Olly Martins. In September 2019 the Labour Party announced that following a ballot of local party members Spurrell had succeeded in becoming the Labour Party Candidate for the PCC elections

The elections scheduled for 7 May 2020 were delayed for 12 months in response to the COVID-19 pandemic and were rescheduled to 6 May 2021. During this time Spurrell volunteered in the community and at food banks. In May 2021 Spurrell was elected in the first round with 56.88% of the vote and took her oath of office on 13 May 2021, beginning her term as PCC.

Her three main priorities during the election campaign were visible and accountable policing, supporting victims and communities and a fair and effective criminal justice system. Within her manifesto, she pledged to introduce police scrutiny panels, hold regular public meetings with the Chief Constable, and give victims a louder voice by establishing a Victims’ Panel. She has also been outspoken on the importance of tackling Violence against Women and Girls.

Spurrell is the chair of the Merseyside Criminal Justice Board, is the National Association of Police and Crime Commissioners' Deputy Lead for Mental Health and Custody and Criminal Justice and a Director of the Independent Custody Visitors Association

Electoral History

References

External links
Emily for Merseyside official site
Office of the Merseyside Police and Crime Commissioner official site
Association of Police and Crime Commissioners official site
Emily Spurrell on Twitter

Living people
21st-century British women politicians
Police and crime commissioners in England
Labour Party police and crime commissioners
Councillors in Liverpool
Alumni of the University of Leeds
1987 births